Mitchell Creek may refer to:

Mitchell Creek (Tunitas Creek), a stream in California
Mitchell Creek (South Dakota), a stream in South Dakota
Mitch Creek, professional basketball player